Kalanchak Raion was one of the 18 administrative raions (a district) of Kherson Oblast in southern Ukraine. Its administrative center was located in the urban-type settlement of Kalanchak. The raion was abolished on 18 July 2020 as part of the administrative reform of Ukraine, which reduced the number of raions of Kherson Oblast to five. The area of Kalanchak Raion was merged into Skadovsk Raion. The last estimate of the raion population was 

At the time of disestablishment, the raion consisted of two hromadas:
 Kalanchak settlement hromada with the administration in Kalanchak;
 Myrne settlement hromada with the administration in the urban-type settlement of Myrne.

References

Former raions of Kherson Oblast
1939 establishments in Ukraine
Ukrainian raions abolished during the 2020 administrative reform